Guglielmo Massaia (9 June 1809 - 6 August 1889), born Lorenzo Massaia, was an Italian cardinal of the Roman Catholic Church who was also a missionary and Capuchin friar. His baptismal name was Lorenzo; he took Guglielmo as religious name.

His cause of canonization has commenced the confirmation of his heroic virtue allowed for Pope Francis to name him as Venerable on 1 December 2016.

Life
Guglielmo Massaia was born on 9 June 1809 in Piedmont as Lorenzo Antonio Massaia.

He was first educated at the Collegio Reale at Asti under the care of his elder brother Guglielmo who served as a canon and precentor of Asti Cathedral. On the death of his brother he passed as a student to the diocesan seminary in 1824; but at the age of sixteen entered the Capuchin Franciscan Order, receiving the habit on 25 September 1825. He completed studies at the seminary in 1826. He took the name of "Guglielmo" around this time.

Massaia was ordained to the priesthood on 16 June 1832 in Vercelli and served as a spiritual director at a hospital in Turin from 1834 to 1836. He served also as the confessor and advisor of Giuseppe Benedetto Cottolengo - future saint.

He was appointed as a lector of theology; but even whilst teaching he acquired some fame as a preacher and was chosen confessor to Prince Victor Emmanuel, afterwards King of Italy, and Ferdinand, Duke of Genoa. The royal family of Piedmont would have nominated him on several occasions to an episcopal see, but he wanted to join the foreign missions of his order.

He obtained his wish in 1846. That year the Congregation of Propaganda, at the instance of the traveller Antoine d'Abbadie, determined to establish the Apostolic Vicariate of Galla for the Oromo in Ethiopia. The mission was confided to the Capuchins, and Massaia was appointed as the first vicar-apostolic. He received episcopal consecration in Rome on 24 May of that year in the church of San Carlo al Corso.

On his arrival in Ethiopia in 1856, he found the country in a state of religious agitation. The titular head of the Ethiopian Orthodox Church, Abuna Qerellos III, had been dead for about 20 years and there was a movement amongst the native Christians towards union with Rome. Massaia, who had received plenary faculties from Pope Pius IX, ordained a number of native priests for the Coptic Rite; he also obtained the appointment by the Holy See of a vicar-apostolic for the Copts, and himself consecrated the missionary Justin de Jacobis to this office. But this act aroused the enmity of the Coptic Patriarch of Alexandria, who sent a bishop of his own, Abuna Salama III, to Ethiopia.

As a result of the ensuing political agitation, Massaia was banished from the country and had to flee under an assumed name. In 1850 he visited Europe to gain a fresh band of missionaries and means to develop his work: he had interviews with the French Minister of Foreign Affairs in Paris, and with Lord Palmerston in London. On his return to the Oromos he founded a large number of missions; he also established a school at Marseille for the education of Oromo boys freed from slavery; besides this he composed a grammar of the Oromo language which was published at Marseilles in 1867.

Menelik's advisor 
Massaia's would find himself reunited with Menelik after ten years, now a king in his hereditary Shewa. However, the two men would meet again under strange circumstances. Massaia came during the British expedition to Abyssinia, and was to deliver a letter from the British vice-consul to Menelik; with the demand that Menelik should refuse asylum in the event Tewodros escaped to Shewa. Massaia would remain at Menelik court as counselor, for the next decade, with invaluable contributions to Menelik's diplomatic endeavors to Europeans.
  
In 1877, father Massaia's was instrumental in the reconciliation between Menelik II and Masasha Sayfu, Menelik's first cousin. This intervention helped abort an attempted coup, and  paved the way for the exile of the sly conspirator, Bafena, Menelik's ex-consort.

Return to Europe 
During his thirty-five years as a missionary he was exiled seven times, but he always returned. However, in 1880 he was compelled by ill-health to resign his mission. In recognition of his merit, Pope Leo XIII raised him to the titular Archbishopric of Stauropolis. Leo XIII also raised him into the cardinalate in 1884 as the Cardinal-Priest of Ss. Vitale, Gervasio e Protasio.

At the command of the pope he wrote an account of his missionary labours, under the title, "I miei trentacinque anni di missione nell' alta Etiopia", the first volume of which was published simultaneously at Rome and Milan in 1883, and the last in 1895. In this work he deals not only with the progress of the mission, but with the political and economic conditions of Ethiopia as he knew them.

He lived his last decade at a Capuchin friary in Frascati and died on 6 August 1889 at 4:30am of cardio-circulatory collapse. His remains were buried in Frascati after the funeral on 10 August 1889, celebrated by Ignazio Perrsico, the Titular Archbishop of Damiata.

Legacy
In 1940 his native village of Piovà was renamed Piovà Massaia in his honour. In 1952, Italy issued a commemorative stamp celebrating his mission to Ethiopia. Many streets and buildings in Italy are named after Guglielmo Massaia, for example the Via Cardinale Guglielmo Massaia in Rome and Turin or the Museo Etiopico Guglielmo Massaia in Frascati (Rome).

He was the subject of the 1939 biopic Cardinal Messias directed by Goffredo Alessandrini and starring Camillo Pilotto as Massaia. It was awarded the Mussolini Cup at the 1939 Venice Film Festival.

Cause for beatification
The process for beatification had its origins as far back as 1914 in which documents were collected in a diocesan process that commenced on 5 December 1941 until an unknown date. The "nihil obstat" (nothing against) was granted on 21 July 1987 which allowed for the formal commencement of the cause of beatification and the granting of the title Servant of God.

The Positio was submitted to the Congregation for the Causes of Saints in 2014 while historians voiced their approval to the cause in a vote undertaken on 21 October 2014. Pope Francis titled him as Venerable on 1 December 2016 upon the confirmation of his life of heroic virtue.

Notes

References
 Massaia, I miei trentacinque anni di missione nell'alta Etiopia; memorie storiche; Analecta Ordinis FF. Min. Capp., V, 291 seq.
 Volumes 1-4 from Internet Archive
 Volumes 5-8 from Internet Archive
 Volumes 9-12 from Internet Archive

External links
Hagiography Circle
Cardinam Massaja

Attribution

Capuchins
Italian Roman Catholic missionaries
19th-century Italian cardinals
Cardinals created by Pope Leo XIII
Roman Catholic missionaries in Ethiopia
1809 births
1889 deaths
19th-century Italian Roman Catholic titular archbishops
19th-century venerated Christians
19th-century Neapolitan people
Italian expatriates in Ethiopia
Venerated Catholics by Pope Francis
Catholic missionaries in Arabia